The 1987 Winston 500 was a NASCAR Winston Cup Series racing event that took place on May 3, 1987, at Alabama International Motor Speedway in Talladega, Alabama. The race was a turning point in the balance between stock car speed and safety in NASCAR.

Davey Allison was the winner of the race, cut ten laps short due to darkness. It was Allison's first win in his career.

Allison's victory was overshadowed by a lap 22 crash in which the car of his father, Bobby Allison went airborne near the track's start/finish line, ripping down almost 100 feet of protective catch fence. Two large steel cables backing the fence managed to deflect Allison's car and prevent it from spearing unabated into the spectator grandstands. If this had happened, the accident had the potential to be a disaster on the scale of the 1955 Le Mans disaster.

Unrestricted high-speed races at Talladega Superspeedway ended after the 1987 Winston 500 because of the lap 22 crash. While the summer race (Talladega 500) would be run with a smaller carburetor, restrictor plates would end up being compulsory by the end of the year.

Background 
Talladega Superspeedway, originally known as Alabama International Motor Superspeedway (AIMS), is a motorsports complex located north of Talladega, Alabama. It is located on the former Anniston Air Force Base in the small city of Lincoln. The track is a Tri-oval and was constructed by International Speedway Corporation, a business controlled by the France Family, in the 1960s. Talladega is most known for its steep banking and the unique location of the start/finish line - located just past the exit to pit road. The track currently hosts the NASCAR series such as the Monster Energy Cup Series, Xfinity Series, and the Camping World Truck Series.

Race report

Qualifying 

Bill Elliott won the pole for this race at a qualifying speed of 212.809 mph (a lap time of 44.998 seconds) this speed created headlines across the country. Elliott had a picture taken of himself with his car and a sign proclaiming it "World's Fastest Race Car".

For comparison, this qualifying speed was rivaling contemporary Indy Car racing; the 1987 Indianapolis 500 saw a top qualifying speed of 215.390 mph logged by Mario Andretti a few days later.

Concerns were already being raised about these speeds. Chevrolet team drivers were reporting that rear tires of the Monte Carlo SS cars were lifting off the track entering turn 3.

Race 
The Winston 500 was scheduled for 188 laps. 178 laps were run.

A major wreck occurred on lap 22 when Bobby Allison ran over debris on the track and suffered a cut tire. "I think I ran over something, I couldn't really tell", Allison explained. "Something bounced under the car and then the tire exploded." This caused the car to turn backward, go airborne, and shear off about 100 feet of the catch fence in front of the start/finish line. Five spectators would be injured as a result of Allison's crash; two of them had to be treated in the hospital while three were treated in the infield medical center and released. Allison's crash did not cause any fatalities, although one spectator lost an eye as a result of flying debris.

The race was red flagged, and remained stopped for two hours, twenty-six minutes while crews repaired the damaged catch fence. Talladega does not have track lighting, so this delay, as well as other caution periods, caused the race to be cut short at 178 laps due to the dark conditions that occurred after 7:45 PM in the Eastern Time Zone. There were 41 American-born drivers on the starting grid. More than one hundred thousand people would see Davey Allison defeat Terry Labonte by more than three-quarters of a second. While most drivers ran the middle or upper groove through the corners, Davey could hold it down low.

The average speed of the race was  lasting three hours and four minutes, excluding the red flag period. Darrell Waltrip broke the windshield on his Tide Ride #17 early in this race when he drove by Allison's car as it got the catch fence and ended up hitting the crankshaft of the #22 after it was ripped from the car and went flying during the wreck. Waltrip's team put a new windshield in the #17 Chevrolet and DW got back in the race, salvaging an 11th-place finish one lap down despite the damage to the roof of his orange Monte Carlo. Richard Petty spun in the chaos of Bobby Allison's wreck and got the intercooler knocked out of his car, causing problems with rear-end fluids plus losing some of the rear panels allowing exhaust to get into the cockpit. Petty started getting gassed by all the carbon monoxide in the car and was legitimately starting to get sleepy at the wheel as a result so he pitted to get out and get some oxygen. Greg Sacks, who had already crashed out his Valvoline #50 Pontiac, took over the King's #43 STP Pontiac for about the last 25 laps of this race once Petty got out.

There were 18 lead changes; Bill Elliott and Davey Allison each led 30 laps. Chet Fillip was the last-place finisher due to a faulty engine on the third lap. Ford and Chevrolet vehicles made up the majority of the participating manufacturers. Ron Bouchard made his final start in NASCAR Cup Series competition in this race while Ed Pimm made his first stock car racing start. Davey Allison would score his first victory in this race.

Finishing order
Section reference:

 Davey Allison (No. 28)
 Terry Labonte (No. 11)
 Kyle Petty (No. 21)
 Dale Earnhardt (No. 3)
 Bobby Hillin Jr. (No. 8)
 Rusty Wallace (No. 27)
 Neil Bonnett (No. 75)
 Ken Schrader (No. 90)
 Lake Speed (No. 83)
 Morgan Shepherd (No. 26)
 Darrell Waltrip (No. 17)
 Benny Parsons (No. 35)
 Dave Marcis (No. 71)
 Sterling Marlin (No. 44)
 Slick Johnson (No. 12)
 Richard Petty (No. 43)
 Mark Stahl (No. 82)
 Eddie Bierschwale (No. 67)
 Steve Christman (No. 62)
 Rick Wilson* (No. 4)
 Ken Ragan* (No. 77)
 Bill Elliott* (No. 9)
 Connie Saylor* (No. 63)
 Rick Knoop* (No. 6)
 Michael Waltrip* (No. 30)
 Greg Sacks* (No. 50)
 Ed Pimm* (No. 98)
 Dale Jarrett* (No. 18)
 Harry Gant* (No. 33)
 Ricky Rudd* (No. 15)
 Phil Parsons (No. 55)
 Buddy Baker* (No. 88)
 Jimmy Means* (No. 52)
 Alan Kulwicki* (No. 7)
 Phil Barkdoll* (No. 73)
 Joe Ruttman* (No. 99)
 Cale Yarborough* (No. 29)
 Ron Bouchard* (No. 1)
 Bobby Allison* (No. 22)
 Geoffrey Bodine* (No. 5)
 Chet Fillip* (No. 81)

* Driver failed to finish race

Failed to qualify
Section reference:
 Blackie Wangerin (No. 39)
 Ronnie Sanders (No. 86)

Standings after the race

References

Winston
Winston 500
NASCAR races at Talladega Superspeedway
NASCAR controversies